Jemutai or Chemutai is a name of  Kalenjin origin. It indicates that the bearer is a girl or lady and was born near dawn ("Mutai"). It is closely related to "Chepkoech", " Chelimo", "Chepkorir", and "Chepyego". Its Masculine equivalent is Kimutai among the Marakwet, Keiyo, Sabaot, Nandi, and the Kipsigis

People
Faith Chemutai (born 1980), Kenyan long-distance track runner
Sharon Jemutai Cherop (born 1984), Kenyan marathon runner
Lenah Jemutai Cheruiyot (born 1973), Kenyan half marathon runner
Peruth Chemutai (born 1999), Ugandan steeplechase runner

Kalenjin names